Hernando Island is one of the Discovery Islands near Powell River, British Columbia, Canada. Along with the nearby Cortes Island, it was presumably named in 1792 by Valdés and Galiano after Hernán Cortés, the Spanish conqueror of Mexico.

A narrow gauge logging railway operated there in the 1920s.  The island is now mostly privately owned by a consortium of larger landowners. In the 1960s the entire island was valued at $55,000.

References

External links
 Hernando Island
 

Islands of the Discovery Islands